Elsholtz is a German surname. Notable people with the surname include:

 Johann Sigismund Elsholtz (1623–1688), German naturalist
 Ludwig Elsholtz (1805–1850), German painter
 Peter Elsholtz (1907–1977), German actor

German-language surnames